Thiri Yaza Dewi Mwei Ma-Gu-Thauk was a principal queen of King Binnya U of Hanthawaddy. She was the mother of Prince Baw Ngan-Mohn, the heir-apparent during the late reign of Binnya U.

Brief
According to the chronicle Razadarit Ayedawbon, she was a commoner village girl from the village of Byat-Laing, north of then capital Martaban (Mottama). One day, Binnya U was returning from an elephant hunting trip, and stopped by at Byat-Laing, and saw her. Taken by her beauty, the king made her his concubine. Her Mon language name Mwei Ma-Gu-Thauk (or Hla Hteik-Khaung in Burmese) means "Epitome of Beauty".

The king was extremely fond of her. She later became a queen with the title of Thiri Yaza Dewi. She bore a son, Baw Ngan-Mohn, about two decades later. The king was fond of Ngan-Mohn, and made him the heir-apparent of the kingdom, by 1382. But she never became the Queen Mother. In 1384, Binnya U died, and Prince Binnya Nwe seized the throne with the help of the court. Nwe, now known as King Razadarit imprisoned Ngan-Mohn, and ordered him executed in 1389/90.

She was also known as the Queen of Pegu because she donated a monastery at the Gu-Nin village near Pegu.

Notes

References

Bibliography
 

Queens consort of Hanthawaddy